In Buddhism, refuge or taking refuge refers to a religious practice, which often includes a prayer or recitation performed at the beginning of the day or of a practice session. Since the period of Early Buddhism all Theravada and mainstream Mahayana schools only take refuge in the Three Jewels (also known as the Triple Gem or Three Refuges, Pali: ti-ratana or ratana-ttaya; Sanskrit: tri-ratna or ratna-traya) which are the Buddha, the Dharma and the Sangha. 

However, only Vajrayana school includes an expanded refuge formula known as the Three Jewels and Three Roots.

Taking refuge is a form of aspiration to lead a life with the Triple Gem at its core. Taking refuge is done by a short formula in which one names the Buddha, the dharma and the saṅgha as refuges. In early Buddhist scriptures, taking refuge is an expression of determination to follow the Buddha's path, but not a relinquishing of responsibility. Refuge is common to all major schools of Buddhism.

In 1880, Henry Steel Olcott and Helena Blavatsky became the first known Westerners of the modern era to receive the Three Refuges and Five Precepts, which is the ceremony by which one traditionally become Buddhist.

Overview

Since the period of Early Buddhism, devotees expressed their faith through the act of taking refuge, which is threefold. These are the three supports or jewels in which a Sutrayana Buddhist takes refuge: 
 The Buddha, the fully enlightened one (i.e. the figure of Sakyamuni Buddha)
 The Dharma, the Buddhist teachings expounded by the Buddha
 The Sangha, the monastic order of Buddhism that practices and preserves the Dharma.

In this, it centres on the authority of a Buddha as a supremely awakened being, by assenting to a role for a Buddha as a teacher of both humans and devās (heavenly beings). This often includes other Buddhas from the past, and Buddhas who have not yet arisen. Secondly, the taking of refuge honours the truth and efficacy of the Buddha's spiritual doctrine, which includes the characteristics of phenomenon such as their impermanence, and the Noble Eightfold Path to liberation. The taking of refuge ends with the acceptance of worthiness of the community of spiritually developed followers (the saṅgha), which is mostly defined as the monastic community, but may also include lay people and even devās provided they are nearly or completely enlightened. Early Buddhism did not include bodhisattvas in the Three Refuges, because they were considered to still be on the path to enlightenment.

Early texts describe the saṅgha as a "field of merit", because early Buddhists regard offerings to them as particularly karmically fruitful. Lay devotees support and revere the saṅgha, of which they believe it will render them merit and bring them closer to enlightenment. At the same time, the Buddhist monk is given a significant role in promoting and upholding faith among laypeople. Although many examples in the canon are mentioned of well-behaved monks, there are also cases of monks misbehaving. In such cases, the texts describe that the Buddha responds with great sensitivity to the perceptions of the lay community. When the Buddha sets out new rules in the monastic code to deal with the wrongdoings of his monastics, he usually states that such behavior should be curbed, because it would not "persuade non-believers" and "believers will turn away". He expects monks, nuns and novices to not only to lead the spiritual life for their own benefit, but also to uphold the faith of the people. On the other hand, they are not to take the task of inspiring faith to the extent of hypocrisy or inappropriateness, for example, by taking on other professions apart from being a monastic, or by courting favours by giving items to the laypeople.

Faith in the three jewels is an important teaching element in both Theravada and Mahayana traditions. In contrast to perceived Western notions of faith, faith in Buddhism arises from accumulated experience and reasoning. In the Kalama Sutra, the Buddha explicitly argues against simply following authority or tradition, particularly those of religions contemporary to the Buddha's time. There remains value for a degree of trusting confidence and belief in Buddhism, primarily in the spiritual attainment and salvation or enlightenment. Faith in Buddhism centres on belief in the Three Jewels.

In Mahayana Buddhism 

In Mahayana Buddhism, the three jewels are understood in a different sense than in Sravakayana or non-Mahayana forms of Buddhism. For example the Buddha is usually explained through the Mahayana doctrine of the three bodies (trikaya).

According to the Mahayana treatise titled Ratnagotravibhāga (Analysis of the Jeweled Lineage), the true meaning of the triple gem is as follows:

 The Buddha is without beginning, middle and end. The Buddha is peace. The Buddha is uncompounded (asamskrta), and spontaneous (anabhoga) Dharmakaya. The Buddha is self-enlightened and self arisen wisdom (jñana), compassion and power for the benefit of others.
 The Dharma is described as the reality which is cessation. This is described as neither existence nor non-existence. It is non-conceptual reality as well as the reality of the path which consists of luminous and stainless jñana that removes all defilement. It is also equated with the dharmakaya.
 The Sangha refers to those beings who realize the true luminous nature of the mind and the "full extent of what is" (yavad bhavikataya) as well as the supreme qualities that make them a refuge.

According to the Tibetan Buddhist master Longchenpa:

According to the Mahayana approach, the buddha is the totality of the three kayas; the dharma encompasses scriptural transmission (contained in the sutras and tantras) and the realization of one’s self-knowing timeless awareness (including the views, states of meditative absorption, and so forth associated with stages such as those of development and completion); and the sangha is made up of bodhisattvas, masters of awareness, and other spiritually advanced beings (other than buddhas) whose nature is such that they are on the paths of learning and no more learning.

Thus, for Mahayana Buddhism, the Buddha jewel includes innumerable Buddhas (like Amitabha, Vajradhara and Vairocana), not just Sakyamuni Buddha. Likewise, the Dharma jewel includes the Mahayana sutras and (for certain sects of Mahayana) may also include the Buddhist tantras, not just the Tipitaka. Finally, the Sangha jewel includes numerous beings that are not part of the monastic sangha proper, including high level bodhisattvas like Avalokiteshvara, Vajrapani, Manjushri and so on.

Recitation in Pali 

The most used recitation in Pali:

Except this there are various recitations mentioned in Pali literature for taking refuge in the Three Jewels. Brett Shults proposes that Pali texts may employ the Brahmanical motif of a group of three refuges, as found in Rig Veda 9.97.47, Rig Veda 6.46.9 and Chandogya Upanishad 2.22.3-4.

Precepts 

Lay followers often undertake five precepts in the same ceremony as they take the refuges. Monks administer the precepts to the laypeople, which creates an additional psychological effect. The five precepts are:

 not killing;
 not stealing;
 not misusing sex;
 not engaging in false speech;
 not indulging in intoxicants.

A layperson who upholds the precepts is described in the texts as a "jewel among laymen".

Refuge in Vajrayana 

In Tibetan Buddhism there are three refuge formulations, the Outer, Inner, and Secret forms of the Three Jewels. The 'Outer' form is the 'Triple Gem', (Sanskrit:triratna), the 'Inner' is the Three Roots and the 'Secret' form is the 'Three Bodies' or trikaya of a Buddha.

These alternative refuge formulations are employed by those undertaking deity yoga and other tantric practices within the Tibetan Buddhist Vajrayana tradition.

See also

References

Citations

Works cited 

 .
 .
 .
 .
 .
 .
 .
 .
 .
 .
 .
 .
 .
 .
 
 .
 .
 .
 .

Further reading
 .
 .
 .
 .

External links 
 Refuge at StudyBuddhism.com
 A Buddhist View on Refuge
 Vajrayana refuge prayer audio
 What are the Three Jewels? at Tricycle.org

Buddhist devotion
Buddhist philosophical concepts
Buddhist practices
Faith in Buddhism
Statements of faith
Tibetan Buddhist practices
Vajrayana practices